The Anthony Zemaitis Three-Decker is a historic triple decker in Worcester, Massachusetts.  Built c. 1914, the house is a well-preserved local example of Colonial Revival styling.  It was listed on the National Register of Historic Places in 1990.

Description and history
The Anthony Zemaitis Three-Decker is located east of downtown Worcester, on the north side of Dartmouth Street in the city's Bloomingdale neighborhood.  It is a three-story wood frame structure, with a hip roof and exterior finished in a combination of wooden clapboards and shingling.  The main facade is asymmetrical, with a full-height polygonal window bay on the right, and a stack of three porches on the left, supported by square posts and topped by a gable.  It has bands of decorative shingling between the levels and brackets in the extended eaves.  Some windows have lights with stained glass.

The house was built about 1914, during a major eastward expansion of residential three-decker construction.  The house's early tenants were ethnically diverse, drawn from other immigrant neighborhoods of the city.  Anthony Zemaitis, the first owner, was a machinist; his tenants were a patternmaker and traffic manager.

See also
National Register of Historic Places listings in eastern Worcester, Massachusetts

References

Apartment buildings on the National Register of Historic Places in Massachusetts
Colonial Revival architecture in Massachusetts
Houses completed in 1914
Apartment buildings in Worcester, Massachusetts
Triple-decker apartment houses
National Register of Historic Places in Worcester, Massachusetts